Gboribiogha John Jonah (born March 6, 1954, in Nembe, Nigeria) is a Nigerian politician and retired naval officer. He is the former deputy governor of Bayelsa State.

References 

1954 births
Living people
Peoples Democratic Party (Nigeria) politicians